Haskey Hasselt is an ice hockey team in Hasselt, Belgium. They are currently playing in the Belgian Hockey League.

Belgian Hockey League Results

External links
Official website

References

Ice hockey teams in Belgium